Gabriel Barcia-Colombo is an American video artist, best known for creating living video installation pieces of "miniature people" encased inside ordinary objects such as suitcases and blenders.

Early life and career
Gabriel graduated from the USC School of Cinema-Television and is currently a Professor of Media Arts at Tisch School of the Arts. 
In 2008, he was awarded the NYFA grant for video.  In 2012, he was made a TED fellow. Gabriel has presented two TED talks since then, one in 2012 and the other in 2013.

In 2014, Gabriel founded “Bunker,” a pop-up VR gallery in New York City which features artists' work in the form of code-driven sculpture, augmented reality and virtual installation. The gallery was re-opened at Sotheby's in new york in 2017.

Art projects

DNA Vending Machine
In 2014, to create the awareness about privacy issues related to the use of information stored in human DNA, Gabriel created a vending machine that dispenses human genetic material. The machine was installed at the Victoria and Albert Museum in London as part of "what is luxury show".

New York Minute
In 2015, Gabriel created video art project entitled “New York Minute” for the Fulton Center. The project featured 52 portraits of New Yorkers doing everyday activities in super-slow motion. The project was honored by the non-profit organization Americans for the Arts.

Hereafter Institute
In 2016, Gabriel created project the "Hereafter Institute" which was premiered at the Los Angeles County Museum of Art as part of the Art and Technology Lab. The project examines the ways in which people memorialize themselves after their death in the digital age and what happens to their data when they die.

Gabriel is the grandson of Spanish poet and writer José Rubia Barcia.

References

External links
 
 
 
 
 

American video artists
Living people
Year of birth missing (living people)